Belmont is an American rock band from Chicago, Illinois.

History
After forming in high school in 2014, Belmont self-released their debut EP titled Vicissitude which was produced by Mat Kerekes of Citizen and his brother. In 2016, after solidifying their lineup, Belmont announced their signing to Mutant League Records and released the EP Between You & Me. In 2017, Belmont released a music video for a new single Step Aside. The band released 'Belmont' a self titled full-length album on August 17, 2018.

Band members

Current members
Taz Johnson – lead vocals  (2014–present)
Brian Lada – drums, guitars, bass (2014–present) ; programming (2019–present)
Jason Inguagiato – lead guitar (2018–present); rhythm guitar (2017–2018)

Former members
Amal Sheth – lead guitar, backing vocals (2014)
Joey Legittino – bass (2014–2015); backing vocals (2014–2016); lead vocals (2014)
Sam Patt – rhythm guitar (2014–2015); lead guitar (2014, 2015–2020) 
Matt Fusi – lead guitar (2015)
Alex Wieringa – bass, backing vocals (2015–2022)

Timeline

Discography

Albums

EPs
Vicissitude (2015, Self-Released)
 Between You & Me (2016, Mutant League)
Water Weight / Step Aside 7" (2017, Mutant League)
Reflections (2020, Pure Noise)
Bowser's Mixtape (2021, Pure Noise)

References

Musical groups from Chicago
Musical groups established in 2014
2014 establishments in Illinois